Atrocity or Atrocities or Atrocious may refer to:
 Atrocity (band), a German metal band
 Atrocities (album), the fourth album by Christian Death
 Mass atrocity crimes, international crimes of genocide, war crimes, and crimes against humanity
 Atrocious (film), a 2010 Spanish film
 Atrocity, a crime against scheduled castes or scheduled tribes in India

See also
 Cruelty
 Crime
 War crime
 Crime against humanity
 Genocide